

Results
Arsenal's score comes first

Football League First Division

Final League table

FA Cup

References

1908-09
English football clubs 1908–09 season